Jonatan Luis Soria (born 25 August 1989) is an Argentine professional footballer who plays as a midfielder.

Career
Soria got his career in senior football started with Estudiantes in 2008. He remained for a total of seven years with the club, making one hundred and seventy appearances whilst scoring six goals; three of which came in the 2011–12 Primera B Metropolitana campaign. Soria spent time out on loan with Sportivo Italiano in 2015, appearing just four times in a season which the club ended with relegation. Soria returned to Estudiantes, though subsequently departed in January 2016 to join Comunicaciones; a fellow third tier team. His debut came on 6 February against Atlanta. He scored five goals in his first three seasons.

Career statistics
.

References

External links

1989 births
Living people
People from Avellaneda Partido
Argentine footballers
Association football midfielders
Primera B Metropolitana players
Estudiantes de Buenos Aires footballers
Sportivo Italiano footballers
Club Comunicaciones footballers
Talleres de Remedios de Escalada footballers
Sportspeople from Buenos Aires Province